Julie Goodyear MBE (née Kemp; born 29 March 1942) is an English actress. She is known for portraying Bet Lynch in the long-running ITV soap opera Coronation Street. She first appeared as Bet for nine episodes in 1966, before becoming a series regular from 1970 to 1995. She returned for eight episodes in 2002 and another seven in 2003. For her role on Coronation Street, she received the Special Recognition Award at the 1995 National Television Awards. She was made an MBE in the 1996 New Year Honours.

Biography
Goodyear was born in Bury, Lancashire, to George and Alice Kemp, who divorced when Goodyear was six years old. Her mother remarried to William Goodyear, whom she knew as her dad. Goodyear was brought up by her grandmother, Elizabeth Duckworth, who died by drowning when Goodyear was thirteen years old. She attended St Anne's Academy in Middleton.

Career

Coronation Street
Goodyear is known for playing barmaid Bet Lynch on the ITV1 soap opera Coronation Street. She started playing the role for a brief time in 1966, but left when senior cast member Pat Phoenix (who played Elsie Tanner) advised her to get some more training. It was at that time she joined Oldham's Repertory Theatre.

Goodyear returned in 1970 and remained in the series for 25 years. She quit Coronation Street in 1995, shortly after winning the Lifetime Achievement Award for her role as Bet Lynch in the first ever National Television Awards. She returned to the role of Bet in 1999 for the home video spin-off The Rover Returns.

In 2002, Goodyear made a brief return to the series. She returned to the show again in 2003, though this time, her appearances were part of a storyline set in Blackpool that involved Liz McDonald (Beverley Callard) and her husband Jim (Charles Lawson), who had recently escaped from prison.

Career after Coronation Street
In 1996, she signed a deal for advertisements for Shredded Wheat. Her other work included filming a pilot of The Julie Goodyear Show for Granada, presenting Live Time on the Granada Breeze network every week day throughout January 1999, and being a DJ on Manchester Talk Radio. In 2001, she appeared in the BBC television comedy sketch series Revolver and on several episodes of the ITV1 game show Lily Savage's Blankety Blank. In 2004, she won the first series of the Living TV reality series, I'm Famous and Frightened!.

In 2005, Goodyear was one of the celebrities taking part in the ITV reality series, Celebrity Fit Club, alongside former Coronation Street co-star Ken Morley. She was originally made team captain but quit the role after six weeks, and the role was taken over by Aldo Zilli. She lost 1 stone 10 pounds, and her team won the show.

She appeared in the reality shows Road Raja, Age Swap, Celebrity Penthouse and Celebrity Stars in Their Eyes as Marlene Dietrich. She had a small role in the British film Tug of War (2006) and in October 2006 played a brief role in Channel 4 soap opera Hollyoaks as Mrs. Temple, owner of a B&B. In October 2009, it was confirmed that she would be starring in Calendar Girls on the West End stage. She appeared in the show for three weeks before dropping out due to a virus. In December 2010, she participated in a Coronation Street special of Come Dine with Me.

In 2012, Goodyear became a housemate on the tenth series of Celebrity Big Brother on Channel 5. She was evicted on Day 22 in a double eviction alongside fellow housemate Lorenzo Borghese.

Filmography

As an Actress

As Herself

Theatre Credits

Honours
She was appointed Member of the Order of the British Empire in the 1996 New Year Honours, "for services to television drama".

Personal life
In 1979, she temporarily left Coronation Street for the second of three times after being diagnosed with cervical cancer, something she kept secret from the public until she had recovered. Following her ordeal with cancer, she founded a charity which resulted in formation of the Julie Goodyear Cancer Screening Centre.

Goodyear has been married four times. Her first marriage at the age of 17 was a shotgun wedding when she was two months pregnant with her son Gary. Her second husband, Tony Rudman, left her on their wedding day. Her third marriage in 1985 was after a long-distance relationship with American Richard Skrob. She married her fourth husband, Scott Brand, 26 years her junior, in 2007 after eleven years of dating. Goodyear has three grandchildren.

Her autobiography, titled Just Julie, was released in November 2006. In the book, she discussed her upbringing, bisexuality, experience with cancer, and Coronation Street.

References

External links

1942 births
Living people
English soap opera actresses
English television actresses
Bisexual actresses
Members of the Order of the British Empire
People from Heywood, Greater Manchester
Actresses from Lancashire
Actors from Rochdale
Reality show winners
English LGBT actors